Priargunsk is an urban locality (an urban-type settlement) and the administrative center of Priargunsky District in Zabaykalsky Krai, Russia. Population:   .

Geography
Priargunsk is on the river Argun. It is located 595 km (by rail) to the south-east. from Chita.

Climate
Priargunsk has a monsoon-influenced humid continental climate (Köppen climate classification Dwb), with warm, humid summers and severe winters.

History
It was founded in 1953. On March 30, 1962, by a decree of the Presidium of the Supreme Soviet of the RSFSR, the working settlement of Tsurukhaitui was renamed and became the urban settlement of Priargunsk. An airport operated until the 1990s.

Economy
There is a food factory, JSC Priargunsky Cheese Factory, LLC Agropromtrans, and trucking enterprises. There is district hospital, maternity hospital, and pharmacy.

References

Urban-type settlements in Zabaykalsky Krai
1953 establishments in the Soviet Union